Chris Roush (born October 20, 1964) is a journalism professor and author in the United States, He is the dean of the School of Communications at Quinnipiac University in Hamden, Connecticut. He previously was the Walter E. Hussman, Sr. Distinguished Professor in business journalism at University of North Carolina.

Early life
Roush was born in Opelika, Alabama. He graduated from Auburn University in 1987 and received his master's degree from the University of Florida in 1990.

Career 
He taught business journalism at Washington & Lee University in 2001-01 and the University of Richmond in 2001-02. 

At UNC-Chapel Hill, he was senior associate dean of the School of Media and Journalism from 2011 to 2015 and director of the master's program from 2007 to 2010.

He worked as a business journalist for The Sarasota Herald-Tribune, The Tampa Tribune, BusinessWeek magazine, The Atlanta Journal-Constitution, Bloomberg News and SNL FInancial, where he was editor in chief and launched Insurance Investor magazine.

He has written the textbook Show me the Money: Writing Business and Economics Stories for Mass Communication, and a history of business journalism, Profits and Losses: Business Journalism and its Role in Society. He is a co-author of The SABEW Stylebook.

In 2010, he was named Journalism Teacher of the Year by the Scripps Howard Foundation and the Association for Education in Journalism and Mass Communication.

He's the founder of Talking Biz News, a news website about business journalists.

References 

1964 births
Living people
University of North Carolina at Chapel Hill faculty
Auburn University alumni
University of Florida alumni
American business and financial journalists